Draconian Times is the fifth studio album by British heavy metal band Paradise Lost. Two tracks from the album, "The Last Time" and "Forever Failure", were released as singles with music videos, and both charted.

The album was played in its entirety on the band's live record Draconian Times MMXI. It was also released with Shades of God and Icon in a boxed set called Original Album Classics.

A song called "Another Desire" was written during the recording of Draconian Times, but not released on the album or the reissues. Instead, it was included in the "Forever Failure" single.

Reception 

Daevid Jehnzen of AllMusic rewarded the album a score of 4.5 out of 5, calling it a mix "between stark, oppressive goth rock and crunching heavy metal" and praising Paradise Lost's ability to "create and sustain a mood".

Ulf Kubanke of Laut.de calls the album "a perfect mix between beauty and morbidity" and also points out that the album sounds "as if Hetfield took a bite out of the album First and Last and Always".

Track listing

Personnel

Band 
Nick Holmes – vocals and lyrics
Gregor Mackintosh – lead guitar
Aaron Aedy – rhythm and acoustic guitars
Steve Edmondson – bass
Lee Morris – drums

Guest musicians 
Andrew Holdsworth – keyboards

Production 
Simon Efemey (Zomba Management Ltd.) – production
Pete "Pee Wee" Coleman – audio engineering, mixing
Kevin Metcalfe (at Townhouse Studios, London) – mastering
Holly Warburton – illustrations and photography
Stylorouge – design and layout
Andy Griffin, Phil Woods, Phil Luff – assisting
 Spoken Dialogue on "Forever Failure":
 taken from "Charles Manson – The Man Who Killed the Sixties"
 produced by Box Productions for Channel Four Television Corporation.

Charts

Weekly charts

Year-end charts

References 

Paradise Lost (band) albums
1995 albums